Eagle Riders (also known as Saban's Eagle Riders) is an animated television adaptation of the Japanese anime series Gatchaman II and Gatchaman Fighter, which have been combined. It was produced by 
Saban Entertainment. 65 episodes aired in Australia on Network Ten from August 14, 1997, to December 4, 1997. In the United States, 13 episodes had previously aired in first-run syndication during the fall of 1996 and 1997.

Premise

Earth is under siege from the alien menace known only by the name Cybercon and its legion of android forces, the Vorak. The Global Security Council convenes to address this problem, and calls upon Dr. Thaddeus Keane for assistance. They remember the aid they had received from Keane's special force, the Eagle Riders, in years past. Keane assures them that the Eagle Riders are still together, still strong, and armed with brand new weapons.

Production
Saban first trademarked the show's name in 1995, and recorded their dub afterwards. In a 2006 interview, one of the writers, Marc Handler, stated that Eagle Riders was "not a good rendition", and that the scripts often lacked continuity with each other. Several episodes were credited as being written by R.D. Smithee, a pseudonym similar to the Alan Smithee pseudonym that has been used when writers and directors are too ashamed to have their names credited in projects they have worked on.

Adaptations and changes
Both series were heavily edited when it came to the adaptation process, with controversial elements removed, as well as the entire soundtrack being replaced with a new one by Shuki Levy and Larry Seymour and the entire sound effects being replaced with new ones.  As with previous English adaptations of Gatchaman, character names and terms were also changed in the localization.

One notable example of the changes made to the series is the removal of Mallanox (Gel Sadra)'s origin and transformation, which happened in the premiere episode of the original Gatchaman II. The character was also changed from female to male, though her correct gender and origin were reinstated in later dub episodes.

Another change, made to segue the two series together, involved the finale of Gatchaman II and the first episode of Gatchaman Fighter being merged, as well as the death of Gel Sadra being cut. Instead, Mallanox is said to have been transformed into a new form, named Happy Boy (originally, the Gatchaman Fighter villain Count Egobossler).

The final eight episodes of Gatchaman Fighter were never translated, due to the objectionable content involved. Instead, the 15th episode of Gatchaman Fighter served as the series finale.

Release and reception
During its 1996–97 syndication run in the US, the show was being aired alongside the first season of Dragon Ball Z, another anime that had been adapted in conjunction with Saban Entertainment. At the time, the two programs attracted minor controversy. A 1997 report on violence in television by UCLA stated that "Eagle Riders and Dragon Ball Z both contain images of mean-spirited, glorified fighting. One episode of Eagle Riders shows a hero viciously throwing metal stars in the faces of different villains."

Even after the syndication run had ended, the initial 13 episodes were still being aired on certain local stations as late as summer 1997, before the remaining 52 episodes saw a release in Australia from August 1997 to December 1997. They aired at 7.30am Mondays to Thursdays on the morning cartoon block Cheez TV. Some episodes that never aired in the USA were shown at the 1997 GachaCon fan convention, which had Eagle Riders producer Rita Acosta as a guest.

Ken Innes of Absolute Anime wrote in his review, "The first thirteen episodes were a nearly straight translation of Gatchaman II with a few embellishments [...]  If there is any hope for a further US release, it will be on cable. Unfortunately, it appears this is as good as it gets. I had the opportunity to preview some of the later episodes in July 1997. They were a major disappointment." He also states that "the new background music is intrusive and doesn't compare to Hoyt Curtin's work in Battle of the Planets, but it is an improvement over the original G-II background music."

Stations

Home video
Eagle Riders has never been released on home video or streaming, and only exists via US and Australian television recordings. The current American ownership of the series is unclear, but all of Saban's rights to the Gatchaman property were originally set to expire on September 7, 2004. However, in 2001 Saban was purchased by Disney, with Disney presumably losing the rights in 2004.

Episodes

Character variations

Team variations in different versions

Other character variations across different versions

Other notable changes

‡The original Japanese-language version of Gatchaman contains a small amount of words in English.

Production staff
Owned and distributed by: Saban Entertainment
Executive Producer: Eric S. Rollman
Producer & Story Editor: Rita M. Acosta
Writer (ADR Script): R.D. Smithee, Marc Handler
Voice Directors: Richard Epcar, Steve Kramer, Heidi Noelle Lenhart (uncredited), Michael Sorich
Production Assistant & ADR Coordinator: Gregory C. Ireland
Executive in Charge of Sound Operations: Clive H. Mizumoto
Sound Operations Manager: Xavier Garcia
Sound Effects Editors: Keith Dickens, Martin Flores, Zoli Osaze, Ron Salaises, John Valentino
Re-Recording Mixers: Michael Beirenger (uncredited), Mark Ettel, R.D. Floyd, Wayne T. O'Brien
ADR Recordists: Carl Lange, Kevin Newson, David W. Barr
Foley Artists: Susan Lewis (uncredited), Kalea Morton, Taryn Simone
Audio Assistants: Brian Densmore, Andrew Kines, Don Sexton
Music by: Shuki Levy, Kussa Mahchi
Executive in Charge of Music: Ron Kenan
Music Supervisor: Lloyd Michael Cook II
Music Editors: Barron Abramovitch, Bill Filipiak
Music Engineer: Barron Abramovitch
Second Engineers: James Dijulio, Frank Bailey-Meier
Music Assistants: Jeremy Sweet, Tim Gosselin
Offline Editor: Terry Marlin
Video Traffic Coordinator: Jerry Buetnner
Post Production Audio: Advantage Audio
Sound Effects Editor: Robert Duran
Dialogue Editor: Robbi Smith
Music Editor: Marc S. Perlman
Audio Transfer: J. Lampinen
Re-Recording Mixers: Fil Brown, Ray Leonard, Mike Beiriger, Jim Hodson, Mellisa Gentry-Ellis
Online Editors: Michael Hutchinson, Harvey Landy (Hollywood Digital Inc.), John Bowen, David Crosthwait (Modern Videofilm)
Telecine: Lee Ann Went (Varitel Inc.), Greg Hamlin (Film Technology, LA), Larry Field (Editel), Brent Eldridge (Ame, Inc.)
Post Production Supervisor: John Bryant
Post Production Coordinator: Francesca Weiss
Executive in Charge of Production: Dana C. Booton

Voice cast
Hunter Harris: Richard Cansino
Joe Thax: Bryan Cranston
Kelly Jenar: Heidi Noelle Lenhart
Mickey Dugan: Mona Marshall
Ollie Keeawani: Paul Schrier
Dr.Thaddeus Keane: Greg O'Neill
Dr.Francine Aikens: Lara Cody
Auto: Dena Burton
Mallanox: R. Martin Klein
Cybercon: Peter Spellos
Misc. (uncredited): Joshua Seth, Bob Bergen, Julie Maddalena, Richard Epcar

References

Further reading
 G-Force: Animated

External links

 

Gatchaman
1996 American television series debuts
1996 anime television series debuts
1997 American television series endings
1990s American animated television series
American children's animated action television series
American children's animated space adventure television series
American children's animated science fantasy television series
American children's animated superhero television series
Japanese children's animated action television series
Japanese children's animated space adventure television series
Japanese children's animated science fantasy television series
Japanese children's animated superhero television series
Adventure anime and manga
American television series based on Japanese television series
First-run syndicated television programs in the United States
Network 10 original programming
Fox Kids
Science fiction anime and manga
Television series by Saban Entertainment